The Massachusetts Instrumental and Choral Conductors Association (MICCA) is a sanctioning body for marching band field contests in the state of Massachusetts. Previous championships were held at the Cawley Memorial Stadium in Lowell, Massachusetts. Championships are now held at Veterans Memorial Stadium in Lawrence, Massachusetts. Its current President is Dave Gresko.

MICCA Festivals were canceled in April 2020 due to the 2019-2020 coronavirus pandemic.

Marching Band Scoring Criteria
The Marching Band festivals are scored individually per group.  Each groups is graded in 5 categories, receiving a score between 1 and 5 stars in each category.  The categories are:

 Music - a grade of the style and execution of the musical selections
 Percussion - a grade of the quality of the percussion and pit ensembles
 Visual - a grade of drill design and execution, as well as marching technique
 Auxiliary - a grade of colorguard and other aspects of the performance not covered above
 General Effect - a grade of the overall impression of the show, including how well different aspects complement each other

The scores are then averaged together, with the overall average corresponding to different medals:

 1–2.5 - Medal of Merit
 2.5-3.5 - Bronze Medal
 3.5-4.5 - Silver Medal
 4.5-5 - Gold Medal

References

External links
 

High school marching bands from the United States
Music organizations based in the United States